The Turner-Ledbetter House is a historic house at 1700 South Louisiana Street in Little Rock, Arkansas.  It is a two-story wood-frame structure, its exterior mostly finished in brick, with a hip roof and a variety of dormers, projections, porches, and decorative elements typical of the Queen Anne period of architecture.  Notable features include a three-story turret with flared conical roof, an entry porch with turned posts, bracketing, and a spindled balustrade, and windows with stone sills.  The house was built in 1891-92 for Susan Turner, and was given additional Craftsman styling during renovations in the early decades of the 20th century.

The house was listed on the National Register of Historic Places in 1987.

See also
National Register of Historic Places listings in Little Rock, Arkansas

References

Houses on the National Register of Historic Places in Arkansas
Queen Anne architecture in Arkansas
Houses completed in 1891
Houses in Little Rock, Arkansas
National Register of Historic Places in Little Rock, Arkansas
Historic district contributing properties in Arkansas